Mariotto may refer to:

Given name
 Mariotto Albertinelli (1474–1515), Italian Renaissance painter
 Mariotto di Nardo (fl. 1388–1424), Florentine painter in the Florentine Gothic style
 Mariotto Segni (born 1939), Italian politician and professor of civil law

Surname
 Angela Mariotto, statistician 
Bernardino di Mariotto (1478–1566), Italian painter
 Danilo Mariotto (born 1996), Brazilian footballer
 Sara Mariotto (born 1997), Italian professional racing cyclist